Fighting Youth is a 1925 American silent action film directed by B. Reeves Eason and starring William Fairbanks, Pauline Garon and George Periolat. A notorious brawler promises his fiancée that he will give up fighting, but then is persuaded to take party in a charity boxing match.

Cast
 William Fairbanks as Dick Covington 
 Pauline Garon as Jean Manley 
 George Periolat as Judge Manley 
 William Bailey as Harold Brennty 
 Pat Harmon as Paddy O'Ryan 
 Frank Hagney as 'Murdering' Mooney 
 Thomas Carr as Gangster 
 Jack Britton as Referee

References

Bibliography
 Munden, Kenneth White. The American Film Institute Catalog of Motion Pictures Produced in the United States, Part 1. University of California Press, 1997.

External links

1925 films
1925 drama films
Silent American drama films
Films directed by B. Reeves Eason
American silent feature films
1920s English-language films
American black-and-white films
Columbia Pictures films
American boxing films
1920s American films